Parliamentary elections were held in Iraq on 17 January 1953 to elect the members of the Chamber of Deputies. The result was a victory for the Constitutional Union Party, which won 67 of the 135 seats. Only 57 seats were contested.

Results

References

Elections in Iraq
Iraq
1953 in Iraq
January 1953 events in Asia